Yoshimasa Ishikawa is a Japanese mixed martial artist. He competed in the Lightweight division. He was Shooto's second middleweight champion, defeating Yasuto Sekishima. Ishikawa vacated the title in 1991 to compete as a lightweight.

He was a trainer for Shooting Gym Yokohama. After retirement, he later opened his own school under the name Mixed Martial Arts Shooshindo.

Championships and accomplishments
Shooto
Shooto Middleweight Championship (one time)

Mixed martial arts record

|-
| Win
| align=center| 4-5
| Tomonori Ohara
| N/A
| Shooto - Shooto
| 
| align=center| 3
| align=center| 0:54
| Tokyo, Japan
| 
|-
| Loss
| align=center| 3-5
| Tomonori Ohara
| TKO (broken hand)
| Shooto - Shooto
| 
| align=center| 2
| align=center| 2:35
| Tokyo, Japan
| 
|-
| Win
| align=center| 3-4
| Yasuto Sekishima
| Decision (unanimous)
| Shooto - Shooto
| 
| align=center| 5
| align=center| 3:00
| Tokyo, Japan
| 
|-
| Loss
| align=center| 2-4
| Satoshi Honma
| Submission (armbar)
| Shooto - Shooto
| 
| align=center| 2
| align=center| 0:00
| Tokyo, Japan
| 
|-
| Win
| align=center| 2-3
| Tomonori Ohara
| Submission (guillotine choke)
| Shooto - Shooto
| 
| align=center| 4
| align=center| 0:00
| Tokyo, Japan
| 
|-
| Loss
| align=center| 1-3
| Manabu Yamada
| TKO (punches)
| Shooto - Shooto
| 
| align=center| 1
| align=center| 2:07
| Tokyo, Japan
| 
|-
| Loss
| align=center| 1-2
| Yasuto Sekishima
| Submission (rear-naked choke)
| Shooto - Shooto
| 
| align=center| 1
| align=center| 1:49
| Tokyo, Japan
| 
|-
| Loss
| align=center| 1-1
| Yasuto Sekishima
| Submission (kimura)
| Shooto - Shooto
| 
| align=center| 1
| align=center| 2:18
| Tokyo, Japan
| 
|-
| Win
| align=center| 1-0
| Kazuhiro Kusayanagi
| KO (spinning back kick)
| Shooto - Shooto
| 
| align=center| 4
| align=center| 0:13
| Tokyo, Japan
|

See also
List of male mixed martial artists

References

External links
 
 Yoshimasa Ishikawa at mixedmartialarts.com

Japanese male mixed martial artists
Lightweight mixed martial artists
Mixed martial artists utilizing catch wrestling
Mixed martial artists utilizing shoot wrestling
Mixed martial artists utilizing shootboxing
Mixed martial artists utilizing shootfighting
Living people
Year of birth missing (living people)